Adrien Plautin (5 June 1902 – 31 July 1996) was a French racing cyclist. He rode in the 1928 Tour de France.

References

1902 births
1996 deaths
French male cyclists
Place of birth missing